The London Post Office Railway 1980 Stock was built by Hunslet in Leeds between 1980 and 1982. The units were originally ordered from Greenbat, but the company went into administration after building just three sets. The design incorporated several of the features tested in the prototype 1962 Stock.

Thirty-four of these units were built, primarily to replace the ageing fleet of 1930/1936 Stock, although some of the earlier units were retained. The new sets were originally numbered in the range 501–534, but this was later amended to 1-34 when a new numbering scheme was introduced in 1984.

Following the closure of the system in 2003, all units have been withdrawn.

 1980